Montegridolfo is a comune (municipality) in the Province of Rimini in the Italian region Emilia-Romagna, located about  southeast of Bologna and about  southeast of Rimini.

The municipality of Montegridolfo contains the frazioni (subdivisions, mainly villages and hamlets) Cabaldo, San Pietro, and Trebbio.

Montegridolfo borders the following municipalities: Mondaino, Saludecio, Sant'Angelo in Lizzola, Tavullia.

History
In the Middle Ages Montegridolfo was a cassero (fortified burg, known from 1148) contended between the Montefeltro and Malatesta families. In 1137 it was largely rebuilt to its present state after a destruction by Ferrantino Novello Malatesta, who had allied with the Montefeltro. After a short period under Cesare Borgia, it was acquired by the Republic of Venice, which in turn ceded it to the Papal States in the early 1509–10.

During World War II, Montegridolfo was across the Gothic Line.

Main sights

Church of San Rocco, just outside the walls, housing three paintings of Madonna with Child with Saints Roch and Sebastian from different ages (early 15th century, c. 1520 and 1623).
Museum of the Gothic Line, named Museo della Linea dei Goti, dedicated to Gerard Ross Norton V.C. M.M. 
Sanctuary of Beata Vergine delle Grazie, in the frazione of Trebbio. It has a 1549 painting by Pompeo Morganti.

Demographic evolution

References

External links
 Official website

Cities and towns in Emilia-Romagna